Stéphane Caillard (born 1 October 1988) is an actress and comedienne. Since 1999, she has appeared in various films and drama series on French TV. In 2004, she played Camille Dassin, the daughter of Richard Bohringer in the TV series Doctor Dassin.

Biography 

In 2011, she appeared in Les Lyonnais, a film directed by Olivier Marchal. In 2012, she joined the Compagnie du Boramar in Collioure, with which she appeared in two plays by Molière. She won her first major role in 2015, playing Alma, one of the three heroines in the series , and then Julia Taro, in the TV series Marseille.

Filmography

Film

Television

References

External links
 

1988 births
Living people
French film actresses
French television actresses
21st-century French actresses
Actresses from Marseille